"My Love" is a song by English indie rock band Florence and the Machine, released as the third single from their fifth studio album, Dance Fever (2022). The song was released on 10 March 2022 by record label Polydor Records. "My Love" was written and produced by Florence Welch and Dave Bayley of the band Glass Animals. The music video for the song was also released on 10 March 2022, and was directed by American director Autumn de Wilde.

Live performances
Florence and the Machine performed "My Love" live on The Tonight Show Starring Jimmy Fallon on 11 May 2022. The song was also featured in the setlist for a "warm-up show" at the Alice Tully Hall in New York City, ahead of the band's upcoming concert tour the Dance Fever Tour. On 15 May 2022, Florence and the Machine performed "My Love" at the 2022 Billboard Music Awards.

Critical reception
In a review of Dance Fever, Neil Z. Yeung of AllMusic dubbed "My Love", "one of the band's best singles, the closest this album comes to nailing the expected level of mainstream 'dance' energy with its shimmering production, heaving beat, and festival-sized chorus".

Track listings
"My Love" – digital download / streaming
 "My Love" (edit) – 2:57
 "My Love" – 3:51

"My Love" (Dave Glass Animals Remix) – digital download / streaming
 "My Love" (Dave Glass Animals Remix) – 3:31

"My Love" (MEDUZA Remix) – digital download / streaming
 "My Love" (MEDUZA Remix) – 3:31

Charts

Release history

References

2022 singles
2022 songs
Florence and the Machine songs
Polydor Records singles
Songs written by Florence Welch
British disco songs
British house music songs
Electropop songs
British dance-pop songs
Songs about the COVID-19 pandemic